Mirza Osman Ali Baig, MBE (9 January 1904 – 1992) was a Pakistani diplomat and cavalry officer in the colonial Indian Political Service.

Biography
Mirza Osman Ali Baig was born in Bombay on 9 January 1904, the son of Sir Abbas Ali Baig, KCIE, CSI (1859-1932) and was educated at Clifton College, Bristol  and the Royal Military College, Sandhurst.

He was commissioned onto the Unattached List for the Indian Army as a second lieutenant in January 1924, spent a year attached to a British Army regiment in India and then joined the Indian Army in March 1925. He served with the 7th Light Cavalry until December 1930, when he was appointed to the Indian Political Service (IPS). With the IPS he served in Sibi, Zhob, Mekran and Peshawar in the North West Frontier Province (NWFP).

In January 1941, as City Magistrate, Peshawar, North West Frontier Province he was appointed a Member of the Order of the British Empire.

Roles
In May 1943 he was appointed as consul for the Portuguese Possessions in India at Nova Goa, and then as consul for the French Establishments in India at Pondicherry. 
Subsequently he served in the following roles:
First Secretary to the Agent-General in India for the USA 1946, 
Counsellor Pakistan Embassy at Washington DC 1947-1949 (Chargé d'Affaires ad interim 1947), 
Acting High Commissioner for Pakistan in Canada 1949, 
Minister in the Pakistan Embassy to the USA, Washington DC 1950-1951, 
Foreign Secretary, Karachi 1951-1952, 
High Commissioner to Canada 1953-1958, 
Secretary-General CENTO 1 January 1959 – 31 December 1961.

Personal life
He married Juliette Jamil (1911-2003). He had a younger brother, Mirza Rashid Ali Baig (1905-1979) who was a diplomat for India post Independence.

He died February 1992 in London.

References

1904 births
1992 deaths
Central Treaty Organisation officials
Leaders of organizations
People educated at Clifton College
British Indian Army officers
Members of the Order of the British Empire
Pakistani emigrants to the United Kingdom
Date of death missing
High Commissioners of Pakistan to Canada
Indian Political Service officers
Foreign Secretaries of Pakistan